Onur Aydın (born 13 January 1988) is a Turkish professional footballer forward who is playing for Alibeyköy.

References

1988 births
Living people
Turkish footballers
Kasımpaşa S.K. footballers
Alibeyköyspor footballers
Adıyamanspor footballers
Darıca Gençlerbirliği footballers
Süper Lig players
Association football forwards